Manuel Reuter (born 7 July 1978), better known by his stage name DJ Manian or just Manian, is a German music producer, DJ and owner of Zooland Records label.

Career
DJ Manian was born in 1978 in Bonn, Germany.

He has produced a number of singles under various pseudonyms. From September 2007 to September 2013 he contributed to the musical project "Spencer & Hill" under the pseudonym Josh Hill alongside the founder of vengeance-sound.com soundset website Manuel Schleis and with former Verano member Dennis Nicholls, with whom he created at the end of 2013 the musical project "TWOLOUD". However, the duo asked not to be identified immediately. In their performances they carried far face drawn hoods and in the music videos they are usually seen from behind on their single covers, and are not visible.

Over the years, DJ Manian maintained a number of different musical collaborations, including Bulldozzer, M.Y.C, Ampire, Phalanx, Plazmatek, Liz Kay, and R.I.O. and the now-defunct Tune Up! in addition to Aila, Cerla, Dan Winter, Darren Styles and Crystal Lake. His 2013 release "Don't Stop the Dancing" featuring Carlprit has charted in a number of European singles charts.

He is a member of the Eurodance trio Cascada, alongside fellow DJ Yanou (with whom he has collaborated many times) and Natalie Horler (who has featured as a guest vocalist on some of his songs). In 2014, he joined TWOLOUD.

Discography

Studio albums

Compilation albums

Singles
Charting

Other releases
2006: Rhythm & Drums / Bounce (DJ Manian vs. Tune Up!)
2007: Lovesong
2007: Raver's Fantasy
2007: The Heat of the Moment (EP)
2007: Turn the Tide (Manian feat. Aila)
2008: Hold Me Tonight (Manian feat. Aila)
2008: Turn The Tide 2k8 (Manian feat. Aila)
2009: Ravers in the UK 
2010: Outta My Head (Darren Styles feat. Manian)
2010: Loco 
2011: Welcome to the Club 2011
2011: F.A.Q. (Crystal Lake vs. Manian)
2012: Hands Up Forever
2013: I'm in Love with the DJ
2013: Cinderella (Manian feat. Maury)
2013: We Don't Care

References

External links
 Official website

German DJs
German record producers
Eurodance musicians
Living people
Place of birth missing (living people)
Electronic dance music DJs
1978 births